Tretopileus is a genus of fungi in the family Corticiaceae. The genus contains three species found in the US and Africa.

References

External links

Corticiales
Agaricomycetes genera